Botilo is a rural locality (a village) in Abakanovskoye Rural Settlement, Cherepovetsky District, Vologda Oblast, Russia. The population was 13 as of 2002.

Geography 
Korablevo is the nearest rural locality.

References 

Rural localities in Cherepovetsky District